Monardella exilis, with the common names Mojave monardella and desert monardella, is an annual plant in the genus Monardella of the mint family (Lamiaceae).

Distribution
The plant is endemic to California, in the Mojave Desert and southern Sierra Nevada. In the Antelope Valley it is found in Desert scrub and Joshua tree woodland habitats. In the Sierra it is also found in pinyon pine (Pinus monophylla) woodlands.

Description
Monardella exilis is an annual herb, growing  in height.
 
It has white flowers with green with purple tinges, during a bloom period from April to September.

References

External links
  Calflora Database: Monardella exilis (Desert monardella,  Mojave monardella)
  Jepson Manual eFlora (TJM2) treatment of Monardella exilis
 UC CalPhotos gallery of Monardella exilis

exilis
Endemic flora of California
Flora of the California desert regions
Flora of the Sierra Nevada (United States)
Natural history of the Mojave Desert
Taxa named by Asa Gray
Taxa named by Edward Lee Greene
Flora without expected TNC conservation status